Adam John Harrington (born November 26, 1972) is a Canadian-American actor and producer. He is known for his role as Roy Earle in the 2011 video game L.A. Noire. He has also appeared on Supernatural, The Secret Circle, Queer as Folk, Dexter and Bosch. He is also known for portraying Sindri in the 2018 video game God of War and its 2022 sequel God of War Ragnarök, for which he received a nomination for the British Academy Games Award for Performer in a Supporting Role.

Personal life
Harrington was born in Hamilton, Ontario, and raised in the nearby towns of Dundas and Burlington, where he attended Burlington Central High School. He earned a master's degree in marine biology before becoming an actor. He currently lives in Los Angeles.   To avoid being confused with another actor of the same name,  professionally he uses his middle initial and thus goes by “Adam J. Harrington".

Career
Harrington's film debut was as Hank in Sanctimony. He was later cast in Showtime's Out of Order and had a recurring role as Ronald Basderic on CSI: Crime Scene Investigation during the 2012–13 season. He played the fallen angel Bartholomew,  in the ninth season of Supernatural.  He had a starring role on The CW's drama series The Secret Circle. He also worked at Sealand Oceanariums in Nanaimo, British Columbia.

Filmography

Film

Television

Video games

References

External links

 Griffin, Jennifer, Adam J. Harrington Talks LA Noire, Roy Earle and That Suit, Screen Spy Interview, July 18, 2011 
 Official Vimeo Page

Living people
1972 births
Canadian male film actors
Canadian male television actors
Canadian male video game actors
Canadian male voice actors
Canadian expatriates in the United States
Canadian emigrants to the United States
American male film actors
American male television actors
American male video game actors
American male voice actors
Male actors from Hamilton, Ontario